Shams al-Din Muhammad ibn 'Isa ibn Hasan al-Baghdadi, known as Ibn Kurr (d. 1357 CE), was a musical theorist of medieval Islam. He is the author of Ġāyat al-matḷūb fī 'ilm al-adwār wa-'l-dụrūb (The Enticing Roads to Rhythms and Modes), a work on the musicological discourse in Cairo during the first half of the 14th century CE. He was born in Cairo to an Iraqi refugee family.

References

 

Musical theorists of the medieval Islamic world
Writers from Cairo
14th-century Arabic writers
1357 deaths
Date of death unknown
Scholars from the Mamluk Sultanate